Ⱬ (minuscule: ⱬ, Unicode codepoints U+2C6B and U+2C6C, respectively) is a Latin letter Z with a descender.

It is used in pre-1983 romanization of the Uyghur language, transliterating ژ , a pre-consonantal allophone of ج  (see Qona Yëziq), but occurring independently in a few words of Russian, Persian or Western origin (such as ⱬurnal from journal). It corresponds to the digraph zh in the current ULY standard.

Also, Z with descender was used in 1932—1936 Latin orthography for the Komi language. It represented a voiced alveolo-palatal sibilant [ʑ].  It is also used in the former Latin alphabet for the Dungan language to represent the voiceless retroflex affricate (tʂ) or the voiceless alveolo-palatal affricate (tɕ).

References

Letters with descender (diacritic)
Latin-script letters